Checkers is a FMCG retailer owned by Shoprite that operates in Southern Africa. Checkers currently has 37 Checkers Hypers and 202 Checkers supermarkets operating in Botswana, South Africa and Namibia. The supermarket chain focuses more strongly on fresh produce and offers a wider range of choice food items to a more affluent clientele (LSM 8-10). Norman Herber, the chair of Greatermans department stores, was the founder of Checkers. The firm was later expanded and made successful by Raymond Ackerman. The Checkers supermarket chain is part of the Shoprite Group.

Store Types
 Checkers: Supermarkets which are being constantly improved and aligned to healthy eating and cleaner living.
 Checkers Hyper: Larger format store with a wider range than the supermarkets. This includes food, household items, clothing, etc.
 Checkers Liquor Shop: Sells Liquor

Rewards Card
In 2016 Checkers tested the Xtra Savings card subsequently shelving it until its launch in late 2019. This programme allows customers to sign-up for a card which they will then need to swipe with each purchase. Unlike, other rewards programmes customers are rewarded with instant savings on purchases instead of points to spend later. Checkers claims that use of the card could result in up to 25% savings and early access to certain sales. There are some public questions about whether the savings are real. This is because discounted prices have been compared with other shop`s normal prices. These comparisons seem to indicate that Checkers advertised savings have been exaggerated.

References

External links
 

Companies based in Cape Town
Supermarkets of South Africa
Retail companies established in 1956
1956 establishments in South Africa